Anthony Virgara (born July 17, 1991) is an American soccer player.

Career

College
Virgara spent his college career at Marshall University between 2010 and 2013.

Professional
On August 21, 2014, Virgara signed a professional contract with USL Pro club Pittsburgh Riverhounds. He had previously been playing with their USL PDL club Pittsburgh Riverhounds U23.

References

External links
 Marshall University bio

1991 births
Living people
American soccer players
Marshall Thundering Herd men's soccer players
Pittsburgh Riverhounds U23 players
Pittsburgh Riverhounds SC players
Association football midfielders
Soccer players from Pennsylvania
USL League Two players
USL Championship players
National Premier Soccer League players